New Life Charter Academy is a public charter school located  in Fort Lauderdale, Florida, in the U.S. state of Florida.

See also
Education in the United States

Charter schools in Florida
Fort Lauderdale, Florida
2014 establishments in Florida
Educational institutions established in 2014